Jenkins County Courthouse is a historic county courthouse in Millen, Georgia. Designed in a Neoclassical Revival architecture style by L.F. Goodrich, it was built in 1910.  Unlike most courthouses in Georgia of the period, this one is three stories tall.  It has columns that are plain and fluted, which are on high bases.  The building has a bracketed cornice.  On top is a copper-domed clock tower.  It was added to the National Register of Historic Places on September 18, 1980.

See also
National Register of Historic Places listings in Jenkins County, Georgia

References

External links
 
 Jenkins Court House historical marker

County courthouses in Georgia (U.S. state)
Courthouses on the National Register of Historic Places in Georgia (U.S. state)
Neoclassical architecture in Georgia (U.S. state)
Government buildings completed in 1910
Buildings and structures in Jenkins County, Georgia
1910 establishments in Georgia (U.S. state)